Emma Buttles Andrews was born in Columbus, Ohio on June 13, 1837, to Joel and Lauretta Buttles. She married Abner L. Andrews in 1859, and gave birth to her son Charles Buttles in 1859; Andrews had additionally been carrying a baby girl in 1860, which resulted in miscarriage. After her husband was admitted to a mental hospital, Abner's father created a separate bequest to Emma that, upon his death in 1865, granted her a considerable sum. Emma Andrews became the mistress and travelling companion of the Newport, Rhode Island millionaire lawyer and archaeologist Theodore M. Davis, as well as an advocate for women's education. Andrews also served as honorary treasurer for the Newport branch of the Egypt Exploration Fund (now the Egypt Exploration Society), in which Davis also served as a board member. The couple made a total of 17 trips along the Nile River aboard Davis's yacht the Bedawin, mainly to the Valley of the Kings in the hopes of uncovering new royal tombs. Her diaries from those trips give researchers rare glimpses into her work with Davis in Egypt. The pair left Egypt in 1913 to settle back in the United States. Andrews died in January 1922.

Expeditions in Egypt 
Emma spent much of her time creating sketches and drawings of Davis' excavations, sitting outside the tombs and excavation sites during the process itself. She was constantly commenting in her journal the conversations of the excavators and Davis himself. Take for example, the tomb of Yuya and Thuyu, and expedition that Davis and Arthur Weigall worked together on. Emma spent much of her time watching the excavation in the heat of Egypt, adding comments such as "I thought he had been affected by bad air, but it was only excitement - for he ejaculated 'wonderful,' 'extraordinary,' etc" in reference to Weigall emerging from the tomb after uncovering a significant portion. Davis went on to continue his excavation of this tomb, even after experts claimed it a lost cause. In this discovery, and the women were granted access to this tomb. Emma commented, remembering "A dim glitter of gold everywhere and a confusion of coffins and mummies."

In January 1903, Andrews and Davis met with Howard Carter several times to discuss the discoveries of the tombs of Maiherpri and Thothmes IV. Andrews remarked that a leather loincloth discovered in the former tomb was some of "the most wonderful work I have seen in Egypt", and had described the discovery of the latter as a "fine success for [Davis] and Carter" for the contents found within, which Andrews records in her diary as being "a splendid sarcophagus, beautiful wall decorations and floor strewn with blue pottery more or less broken".

Andrews was present for the 1905 first opening of the tomb of Yuya, grandfather of Akhenaten and great-grandfather of Tutankhamen, which was considered to be one of the greatest discoveries of Egyptology until eclipsed by Carter’s discovery of the tomb of Tutankhamen, and had noted with pride in her diary that, since experts considered it unlikely for a tomb to be in this location, it was only by Davis’ thoroughness that the tomb was discovered.

Education and Advocacy work 
Andrews was elected in 1887 as Vice President for the Newport Industrial School for Girls shortly after moving in with Davis.

While on a cruise of the Nile with Davis in February 1905, the couple inspected a newly built women's school in Luxor that Davis financed and for which Andrews strongly championed.

References

1837 births
1922 deaths